Kamat cabinet was the Council of Ministers in Goa Legislative Assembly headed by Chief Minister Digambar Kamat.

Council members 
 Ravi Naik
 Sudin Dhavalikar
 Jose Philip D'Souza
 Filipe Nery Rodrigues
 Manohar Ajgaonkar
 Joaqium Alemao
 Vishwajit Rane
 Aleixo Sequeira
 Churchill Alemao
 Atanasio Monserrate
 Nilkanth Halarnkar

Former members 
 Pandurang Madkaikar
 Dayanand Narvekar
 Francisco Pacheco

References 

Cabinets established in 2007
2007 establishments in Goa
Goa ministries
Indian National Congress state ministries
Maharashtrawadi Gomantak Party
Indian National Congress of Goa
2012 disestablishments in India
Cabinets disestablished in 2012